Şenol Can (born 3 April 1983) is a Bulgarian-Turkish professional football coach and a former player who played as a left back. He last managed Süper Lig club Kasımpaşa.

Playing career
Born in Bulgaria to a Turkish family, Can moved with his family at an early age in Bursa, Turkey. He started his football career in the local Bursa Merinosspor Academy, later moving to Bursaspor, before returning to Burca Merinosspor to make his professional debut. He spend his career playing in the Turkish league, spending most time in Antalyaspor and Gaziantepspor, before moving to Fatih Karagümrük.

Coaching career
Can retired from football in 2019, becoming assistant manager in Fatih Karagümrük, the team he played last. In July 2020 he was promoted to manager of the team and secured his team first ever promote to Süper Lig. He left the team on 15 March 2021 by mutual agreement.

On 24 March 2021 he was announced as the new manager of Kasımpaşa, after Fuat Çapa release as manager.

Managerial statistics

References

External links
 
 
 

1983 births
Living people
People from Kardzhali
Bulgarian footballers
Bulgarian football managers
Bulgarian expatriate football managers
Turkish footballers
Turkish football managers
Bulgarian people of Turkish descent
Antalyaspor footballers
İnegölspor footballers
Adana Demirspor footballers
Gaziantepspor footballers
Fatih Karagümrük S.K. footballers
Süper Lig players
TFF First League players
TFF Second League players
Association football defenders
Fatih Karagümrük S.K. managers
Bulgarian Turks in Turkey
Süper Lig managers
Kasımpaşa S.K. managers